Baidi may refer to:

Baidi a Chinese deity

China
Places named Báidì (白地), meaning "White Land" or "Fallowland":

 Baidi Township (白地乡), a township in Nagarzê County, Tibet
 Baidi (village), a village in Baidi Township

Others
 Baidicheng (白帝城, lit. "City of the White Emperor"), an ancient temple complex in Fengjie County, Chongqing
 Baidi people (白狄, lit. "The White Di"), an ancient tribe originally living nomadically in Shaanxi and later settled as the State of Zhongshan in Hebei

Nepal
 Baidi, Nepal, a city in Nepal